Owen Jones (December 29, 1819 – December 25, 1878) was an American politician from Pennsylvania who served as a Democratic member of the U.S. House of Representatives for Pennsylvania's 5th congressional district for one term from 1857 to 1859. During the American Civil War he raised a troop of cavalry that would become Company B of the 1st Pennsylvania Cavalry Regiment and served as colonel.

Early life and education
Owen Jones was born on December 29, 1819, near Ardmore, Pennsylvania, to Jonathan and Mary (nee McClenaghan) Jones. He attended the public schools and graduated from the University of Pennsylvania in Philadelphia. He studied law in Philadelphia under William M. Meredith. He was admitted to the bar of Montgomery County, Pennsylvania, in 1842, and commenced practice in Ardmore. He also was active in agriculture and raised animals and worked on the improvement of farming techniques. In 1845, he purchased a former estate in West Philadelphia and realized a huge gain in value. He served as a county commissioner.

Political career
Jones was elected as a Democrat to the Thirty-fifth Congress. While in Congress, he served as chairman of the United States House Committee on Expenditures in the Department of State. He was an unsuccessful candidate for reelection in 1858. He served as a delegate from Pennsylvania for the 1860 Democratic National Conventions.

Military career

During the American Civil War, Jones raised a company of cavalry known as the Lower Merion Troop that would become Company B of the 1st Pennsylvania Cavalry Regiment. Jones fought at Dranesville, Battle of Cross Keys, Battle of Cedar Mountain, Second Battle of Bull Run and at Fredericksburg. Jones also took part in the failed offensive attempt to capture Richmond, Virginia known as the Mud March. This was the last engagement that Jones took part in during the Civil War. Jones entered service as a captain, was promoted to major on August 5, 1861, to lieutenant colonel on January 3, 1862, and to colonel on May 5, 1862. He resigned his commission in October 1863 and returned home  to practice law near Ardmore.

Personal life and death
Jones married Mary Roberts and together they had two children.

Jones lived in a mansion built in 1803 that he named Wynne Wood in honor of the link between the Wynne and Jones families. The mansion burned down in 1858 and was rebuilt.  The name Wynnewood is 
used for the surrounding community of Wynnewood, Pennsylvania and Wynnewood railroad station. The former estate is now part of the Merion Cricket Club.

He died on December 25, 1879. He was found dead while walking to his neighbor's house for a social engagement.  The reported cause of death was apoplexy. He  was interred in Laurel Hill Cemetery in Philadelphia.

Citations

External links

1819 births
1878 deaths
19th-century American lawyers
19th-century American politicians
American lawyers admitted to the practice of law by reading law
American people of Welsh descent
Burials at Laurel Hill Cemetery (Philadelphia)
Democratic Party members of the United States House of Representatives from Pennsylvania
Farmers from Pennsylvania
Montgomery County Commissioners (Pennsylvania)
Pennsylvania lawyers
People from Lower Merion Township, Pennsylvania
People of Pennsylvania in the American Civil War
Union Army colonels
University of Pennsylvania alumni